KMCH is a full-service radio station licensed to Manchester, Iowa, serving Manchester and Delaware County. KMCH is owned and operated by Delaware County Broadcasting and broadcasts from a tower in rural Delaware County, east of Manchester.

History
KMCH was launched on December 5, 1991 and is the county's only radio station.

Programming
The station broadcasts a full-service format, with varied music programming including adult contemporary, new country, Classic Country, oldies, classic rock, contemporary Christian and Top 40 music.

KMCH broadcasts a variety of news content, including national news from CBS News Radio, state news from Radio Iowa, and local news, including agricultural and business news, as well as local weather and sports, plus funeral announcements, health information, and a community calendar.  KMCH also broadcasts local religious services and religious programming on Sunday mornings.

Syndicated programming is also heard on KMCH, with the station airing musical shows "Hall of Fame Coast to Coast", "Thunder Road", "Casey Kasem's American Top 40: The 70's", "Acoustic Café", "The Weekly Pop 20", "25 Years of Hits", and "The House of Blues Radio Hour".

The station also airs the syndicated religious programs "The Beacon", "The Lutheran Hour", "Sing for Joy", and "Woman to Woman".

References

External links
 Mix 94.7 KMCH Online
 Mix 94.7 KMCH on Facebook
 

MCH
Full service radio stations in the United States
Radio stations established in 1991
1991 establishments in Iowa